Nina Pacari (Kichwa nina "fire", paqariy "to appear, dawn"), born as María Estela Vega Conejo (born 9 October 1961 in Cotacachi, Imbabura) is a Kichwa politician, lawyer and indigenous leader from Ecuador.

Biography 
Nina Pacari studied jurisprudence at the Central University of Ecuador in Quito, where she got to know other indigenous students and began to fight for indigenous rights and the defense of the Kichwa language. At the age of 24, she changed her Spanish name officially to the Kichwa Nina Pacari.

Nina Pacari worked as a lawyer for the Federación de los pueblos Kichwa de la Sierra Norte del Ecuador (FICI), an organization in Imbabura which is now a member of ECUARUNARI. After that, she supported Kichwa communities as a lawyer in the Chimborazo Province.

In 1989, she became a legal adviser of the indigenous confederation CONAIE, founded in 1986. In the uprising of 1990 she supported indigenous communities in Chimborazo and participated in the negotiations with the government. In 1994, she worked out an alternative draft against the draft law of president Sixto Durán Ballén, which was not realized due to the peasants' resistance.

Political career 
In 1997, she was the representative of Chimborazo in the National Assembly and collaborated in the elaboration of the new constitution. In August 1998, she was the first indigenous woman to be elected to the Ecuadorian parliament, as a member of the newly established Pachakutik movement.

In 2003, she became the foreign minister in the government of Lucio Gutiérrez, but soon after she resigned together with the agriculture minister Luis Macas because of the neoliberal policy of Gutiérrez.

In May 2007, she was elected judge of the Constitutional Court of Ecuador.

Works 
Las cultures nacionales en el estado multinacional ecuatoriano. Antropolgía, cuadernos de investigación 3 (noviembre de 1984): 113-22.
Los indios y su lucha jurídico-política. Revista ecuatoriana de pensamientomarxista 12 (1989): 41-47.
Levantamiento indígena. In Sismo étnico en el Ecuador: Varias perspecti-vas, edited by José Almeida et al., 169-86. Quito, Ecuador: CEDIME—Ediciones Abya-Yala, 1993.
Taking on the Neoliberal Agenda. NACLA Report on the Americas 29,no. 5 (March–April 1996): 23-32
"The Political Participation of Indigenous Women in the Ecuadorian Congress: Unfinished Business"lInternational IDEA, 2002, Women in Parliament, Stockholm (http://www.idea.int).

External links 
CV of Nina Pacari (PDF) (248 kB)

References 

1961 births
Living people
People from Cotacachi (city)
Ecuadorian people of Quechua descent
Central University of Ecuador alumni
20th-century Ecuadorian lawyers
Confederation of Indigenous Nationalities of Ecuador politicians
Pachakutik Plurinational Unity Movement – New Country politicians
Members of the National Congress (Ecuador)
Foreign ministers of Ecuador
Constitutional court judges
Ecuadorian judges
Ecuadorian women judges
Ecuadorian women lawyers
Female foreign ministers
Women government ministers of Ecuador
Ecuadorian women diplomats
21st-century Ecuadorian women politicians
21st-century Ecuadorian politicians